Yoon Bo-sang (born 9 September 1993) is a South Korean footballer who plays as goalkeeper for Seoul E-Land FC in K League 2.

Career
Yoon played college football for University of Ulsan.

Yoon Bo-sang joined K League Classic side Gwangju FC in January 2016.

In 2022 season, he was traded with Kim Kyeong-min and joined Seoul E-Land FC.

References

External links

1993 births
Living people
Association football goalkeepers
South Korean footballers
Gwangju FC players
Gimcheon Sangmu FC players
Jeju United FC players
Seoul E-Land FC players
K League 1 players
K League 2 players